Ingushetia is a federal republic and subject of Russia.

Ingushetia may also refer to:
Nazran Okrug (1921–1924), an administrative division of the Mountain ASSR within the Russian SFSR
Ingush Autonomous Oblast (1924–1934), an administrative division of the Russian SFSR

See also
Ingush (disambiguation)